Antichlidas trigonia is a species of moth of the family Tortricidae. It is found in China (Henan, Hubei).

References

	

Moths described in 2004
Eucosmini
Moths of Asia